Siarhei Prytytski (Siarhiej Prytycki , Sergey Pritytsky, ; February 1, 1913, Harkawicze - June 13, 1971, Minsk) was a Belarusian Soviet statesman.

Having started as a Communist activist in Western Belarus (then part of the Second Polish Republic), after the Soviet invasion of Poland he became a high-ranking politician in the Belarusian Soviet Socialist Republic.

Childhood

Prytytski was born on February 1, 1913, in Harkawicze in the Polish-Belarusian borderlands, then part of the Russian Empire, as the third son of a school watchman. In 1914 his family fled to Nizhny Shkaft, Penza Oblast, Russia from the approaching front of the First World War.

Activism and imprisonment in West Belarus

In 1931 Prytytski became Secretary of the youth branch (Komsomol) of the illegal Communist Party of West Belarus in Krynki in the Second Polish Republic. In 1932 he became member of the party and was elected secretary of the local party branch in Hrodna In 1933 Prytytski was for the first time arrested by Polish authorities and put into a prison in Hrodna, but soon released.

In 1933 - 1934 he was a member of the local committee of the CPWB Komsomol in Slonim and led strikes of forestry workers in the area. In 1934 - 1935 he studied at the CPWB school in Minsk, East Belarus, USSR. In 1935 he became Secretary of the local youth branch of the CPWB in Slonim.

Prytytski made a widely publicized unsuccessful assassination attempt on a Polish agent provocateur Jakub Strelczuk in the Polish court at Wilno on 27 January 1936, shooting from two Nagant revolvers. The operation was planned and organized by the leader of the West Belarusian Komsomol Mikalai Dvornikau, who also was the backup of the main executor. After the shooting, Prytytski was arrested and sentenced to death. The death sentence provoked wide international protest in West Belarus, Poland, France, Czechoslovakia and the United States. Following the protests, the Polish authorities changed the sentence to life imprisonment.

In September 1939, after the Soviet invasion of Poland, Prytytski was freed. He was elected into the People's Assembly of West Belarus and made a presentation demanding West Belarus to join the Soviet Union.

Career in the USSR
After the reunification of West Belarus with the Belarusian SSR, in late 1939 Prytytski was made deputy head of the executive committee of the newly established Belastok Voblast.

After Germany's attack on the USSR in June 1941, Prytytski escaped to the eastern part of Belarus still under the Soviet control. In June–August 1941 he led the defense preparations around Mahiliou and the creation of defense militia near Homel.

In 1942 - 1944 Prytytski was Second Secretary of the Central Committee of the Belarusian branch of the Komsomol. In 1944 - 1945 he was head of a pro-Soviet Polish partisan command staff. For his command of Polish partisans, he was awarded one of his Orders of the Red Banner.

After the end of the Second World War, Prytytski became one of the most successful Soviet statesman from the ranks of the former West Belarusian pro-Soviet activists.

He served as the head of regional party branches in Hrodna, Baranavichy, Maladzyechna and Minsk Voblasts. During his work, he organized collectivization of local agriculture. In the first post-war years, Prytytski was close to being arrested under accusations of anti-Soviet espionage for Poland.

In the 1960s, Prytytski has held senior posts in the Soviet Belarus.

From 1962 to 1968 he was Secretary of the Central Committee of the Communist Party of Belarus and Deputy Head of the Government of Belarus.

In 1968-1971 Prytytski was Head of Presidium of the Supreme Soviet of Belarus.

Homage 
 Vladimir Korsh-Sablin, a notable Belarusian Soviet director, filmed the movie "Red Leaves" (Belarusfilm, 1958) about Prytytski's underground experience in Western Belarus.
 There are streets named after Prytytski in Minsk, Hrodna, Maladziechna and Baranavichy (Vulica Prytyckaha).
 In Minsk, there two memorial plaques on the walls of the buildings where he lived.
 In 1978, the book "Life given to the people" was published, in which articles and speeches by Prytytski, documents and memoirs about him were placed. It was opened with the introductory article "The People's Hero" by Pyotr Masherov.

External links
 Documents about Prytytski in the state archives of Belarus
 "Red Leaves" movie (in Russian)

Sources

1913 births
1971 deaths
People from Sokółka County
People from Sokolsky Uyezd
Communist Party of Western Belorussia politicians
Central Committee of the Communist Party of the Soviet Union members
Members of the Central Committee of the Communist Party of Byelorussia
Heads of state of the Byelorussian Soviet Socialist Republic
Members of the Supreme Council of Belarus
First convocation members of the Supreme Soviet of the Soviet Union
Second convocation members of the Supreme Soviet of the Soviet Union
Third convocation members of the Supreme Soviet of the Soviet Union
Fourth convocation members of the Supreme Soviet of the Soviet Union
Fifth convocation members of the Supreme Soviet of the Soviet Union
Sixth convocation members of the Supreme Soviet of the Soviet Union
Seventh convocation members of the Supreme Soviet of the Soviet Union
Eighth convocation members of the Supreme Soviet of the Soviet Union
Prisoners sentenced to death by Poland
Belarusian prisoners sentenced to death
Soviet military personnel of World War II
Soviet partisans
Belarusian partisans
Recipients of the Order of Lenin
Recipients of the Order of the Red Banner
Failed assassins